"Šâhe ğažur-o-mehrabane ma" was the national anthem of the Kingdom of Afghanistan from 1943 to 1973. The song was officially launched in 1943 and replaced the first national anthem: The Royal Salute, created during the reign of Amanullah Khan. In 1973, the kingdom was overthrown, and the song was also abolished.

Lyrics

Persian original

English translation
O our King, brave and grand
Thy soul we obey
Thy children we are
Thy believers we are
O our King
O our King
O our beloved King!

See also

List of historical national anthems
Afghan National Anthem

References

External links

Afghan songs
Asian anthems
Historical national anthems
National symbols of Afghanistan
National anthem compositions in E-flat major